Peter David Johnson (born 12 November 1949 in Sherwood) is an English former first-class cricketer active 1972–82 who played for Nottinghamshire.

References

External links

1949 births
Living people
People educated at Nottingham High School
Alumni of Emmanuel College, Cambridge
Cricketers from Nottingham
English cricketers
Nottinghamshire cricketers
Cambridge University cricketers
Minor Counties cricketers
Cambridgeshire cricketers
Lincolnshire cricketers
People from Sherwood, Nottingham
Cricketers from Nottinghamshire
D. H. Robins' XI cricketers
Oxford and Cambridge Universities cricketers